Dentilimosina is a subgenus of flies belonging to the family Lesser Dung flies.

Species
O. denticulata (Duda, 1924)

References

Sphaeroceridae
Diptera of Europe
Insect subgenera